In the mathematical theory of random matrices, the Marchenko–Pastur distribution, or Marchenko–Pastur law, describes the asymptotic behavior of singular values of large rectangular random matrices.  The theorem is named after Soviet mathematicians Vladimir Marchenko and Leonid Pastur who proved this result in 1967.

If  denotes a  random matrix whose entries are independent identically distributed random variables with mean 0 and variance  , let

 

Finally, consider the random measure

 

Theorem.  Assume that  so that the ratio .  Then  (in weak* topology in distribution), where
 
and
 
with
 

The Marchenko–Pastur law also arises as the free Poisson law in free probability theory, having rate  and jump size .

Cumulative distribution function

Using the same notation, cumulative distribution function reads 
 
where

Some transforms of this law

The Cauchy transform (which is the negative of the Stieltjes transformation), when , is given by

 

 

and the -transform:

Application to correlation matrices
When applied to correlation matrices 
 

For instance, obtaining a correlation matrix of a year long series (i.e. 252 trading days) of 10 stock returns, would render . Out of 10 eigen values of the correlation matrix only the values higher than 1.43 would be considered significant.

See also 
 Wigner semicircle distribution
 Tracy–Widom distribution

References

 
  Link to free-access pdf of Russian version
  Link to free download Another free access site
 
 

Probability distributions
Random matrices